Laura Bottici (born 3 July 1971) is an Italian politician from the Five Star Movement. She has been a Senator since 2013.

References 

1971 births
Living people
Senators of Legislature XVII of Italy
Senators of Legislature XVIII of Italy
Five Star Movement politicians
21st-century Italian women politicians
20th-century Italian women
Women members of the Senate of the Republic (Italy)